Just Dance: Best Of (known as Just Dance: Greatest Hits for the Xbox 360 and NTSC Wii) is a music rhythm game released on the Wii and Xbox 360. It is part of the Just Dance video game series published by Ubisoft originally on the Wii. The game includes songs from Just Dance, Just Dance 2, Just Dance: Summer Party, and Just Dance 3, with the latter game used as its basis. The game was released for PAL Wii as Just Dance: Best Of with 25 songs on March 29, 2012 in Australia and March 30, 2012 in Europe, and for Xbox 360 and NTSC Wii as Just Dance: Greatest Hits with 35 songs on June 21, 2012 in Australia, June 22, 2012 in Europe and June 26, 2012 in North America.

Gameplay

Like the previous games in the Just Dance main series, up to four players can play to mirror on-screen dance choreography from many different songs, as they are judged on their ability to follow a dance routine to a chosen song. Returning features in the game include Non-Stop Shuffle, Speed Shuffle, Simon Says, Shout Out, Just Sweat and Just Create (Xbox 360 only).

Track listing
Both games consist of some tracks from Just Dance, most tracks from Just Dance 2, and 3 tracks from Just Dance 3.

Notes

References

External links

2012 video games
Dance video games
Fitness games
Just Dance (video game series)
Kinect games
Music video games
Ubisoft games
Video game compilations
Video games developed in France
Wii games
Xbox 360 games